The Uzbekistan national basketball team is the national basketball team of the Uzbekistan and is governed by the Uzbekistan Basketball Federation.

The team had its best years between the mid-90s and the mid-2000s when it regularly qualified for the FIBA Asia Championship. Its best performance was 7th place at the 1995 Asian Basketball Championship when Uzbekistan finished ahead of heavily favored Iran and Philippines.

Competitive record

Summer Olympics
yet to qualify

World Championship
yet to qualify

FIBA Asia Cup

Asian Games

1994 : Did not qualify
1998 : 9th
2002 : Did not qualify
2006 : 11th
2010 : 11th
2014 : Did not qualify
2018 : To be determined

Islamic Solidarity Games

never participated

Current roster
Team for the FIBA Asia Championship 2011: (last publicized squad)

Depth chart

Past rosters
2009 Squad:
Head coach:  Oleg Levin

Head coach position
 Oleg Levin – 2005-2009
 Batir Miradilov - 2010
 Oleg Levin – 2011-2012

Kit

Manufacturer
2012: Peak

See also
Uzbekistan national under-19 basketball team
Uzbekistan national under-17 basketball team
Uzbekistan women's national basketball team
Uzbekistan national 3x3 team

References

External links
Uzbekistan Basketball Records at FIBA Archive
Uzbekistani Men National Team 2016 at Asia-basket.com

Basketball in Uzbekistan
Basketball teams in Uzbekistan
Men's national basketball teams
Basketball
1992 establishments in Uzbekistan